London Detective Mysteria is a 2013 otome visual novel video game for the PlayStation Portable created by Karin Entertainment and published by Marvelous in Japan.

This version includes extra scenarios, a slightly different voice cast and a new artist. This version of the game will be released by Xseed Games in North America and Europe for PlayStation Vita and Microsoft Windows in 2019.

Gameplay
English Detective Mysteria is classified as an otome game; like most otome games, the player takes the role of the main female character, Emily, who can choose from a variety of male characters as her love interest.

Characters
Most of the characters of English Detective Mysteria are inspired by famous figures of the detective mystery genre. Besides Sherlock Holmes' and Watson' respective offspring, the game features Sara Marple, niece of Agatha Christie's Jane Marple and Jean Lupin, son of the French thief Arsène Lupin created by Maurice Leblanc. Characters Kenichirou Akechi and Seiji Kobayashi are an homage to Edogawa Ranpo's mystery series protagonists Kogoro Akechi and stepson Yoshio Kobayashi.

Notes

References

External links
  
 

2013 video games
Detective video games
Marvelous Entertainment
PlayStation Portable games
PlayStation Vita games
Video games developed in Japan
Video games featuring female protagonists
Visual novels
Windows games
Otome games
Xseed Games games
Single-player video games